The outer ear, external ear, or auris externa is the external part of the ear, which consists of the auricle (also pinna) and the ear canal. It gathers sound energy and focuses it on the eardrum (tympanic membrane).

Structure

Auricle

The visible part is called the auricle, also known as the pinna, especially in other animals. It is composed of a thin plate of yellow elastic cartilage, covered with integument, and connected to the surrounding parts by ligaments and muscles; and to the commencement of the ear canal by fibrous tissue. Many mammals can move the pinna (with the auriculares muscles) in order to focus their hearing in a certain direction in much the same way that they can turn their eyes. Most humans do not have this ability.

Ear canal

From the pinna, the sound waves move into the ear canal (also known as the external acoustic meatus) a simple tube running through to the middle ear. This tube leads inward from the bottom of the auricula and conducts the vibrations to the tympanic cavity and amplifies frequencies in the range 3 kHz to 12 kHz.

Auricular Muscles

Intrinsic muscles

The intrinsic auricular muscles are:
 The helicis major is a narrow vertical band situated upon the anterior margin of the helix. It arises below, from the spina helicis, and is inserted into the anterior border of the helix, just where it is about to curve backward.
 The helicis minor is an oblique fasciculus, covering the crus helicis.
 The tragicus is a short, flattened vertical band on the lateral surface of the tragus. Also known as the mini lobe.
 The antitragicus arises from the outer part of the antitragus, and is inserted into the cauda helicis and antihelix.
 The transverse muscle is placed on the cranial surface of the pinna. It consists of scattered fibers, partly tendinous and partly muscular, extending from the eminentia conchae to the prominence corresponding with the scapha.
 The oblique muscle also on the cranial surface, consists of a few fibers extending from the upper and back part of the concha to the convexity immediately above it.

Extrinsic muscles

The extrinsic auricular muscles are the three muscles surrounding the auricula or outer ear:
 anterior auricular muscle
 superior auricular muscle
 posterior auricular muscle

The superior muscle is the largest of the three, followed by the posterior and the anterior.

In some mammals these muscles can adjust the direction of the pinna. In humans these muscles possess very little action.
The auricularis anterior draws the auricula forward and upward, the auricularis superior slightly raises it, and the auricularis posterior draws it backward. The superior auricular muscle also acts as a stabilizer of the occipitofrontalis muscle and as a weak brow lifter. The presence of auriculomotor activity in the posterior auricular muscle causes the muscle to contract and cause the pinna to be pulled backwards and flatten when exposed to sudden, surprising sounds.

Function

One consequence of the configuration of the outer ear is selectively to boost the sound pressure 30- to 100-fold for frequencies around 3 kHz. This amplification makes humans most sensitive to frequencies in this range—and also explains why they are particularly prone to acoustical injury and hearing loss near this frequency. Most human speech sounds are also distributed in the bandwidth around 3 kHz.

Clinical significance
Malformations of the external ear can be a consequence of hereditary disease, or exposure to environmental factors such as radiation, infection. Such defects include:
A preauricular fistula, which is a long narrow tube, usually near the tragus. This can be inherited as an autosomal recessive fashion and may suffer from chronic infection in later life.
 Cosmetic defects, such as very large ears, small ears.
 Malformation that may lead to functional impairment, such as atresia of the external auditory meatus or aplasia of the pinna, 
 Genetic syndromes, which include:
Konigsmark syndrome, characterised by small ears and atresia of the external auditory canal, causing conductive hearing loss and inherited in an autosomal recessive manner.
 Goldenhar syndrome, a combination of developmental abnormalities affecting the ears, eyes, bones of the skull, and vertebrae, inherited in an autosomal dominant manner.
Treacher Collins syndrome, characterised by dysplasia of the auricle, atresia of the bony part of the auditory canal, hypoplasia of the auditory ossicles and tympanic cavity, and 'mixed' deafness (both sensorineural and conductive), inherited in an autosomal dominant manner.
Crouzon syndrome, characterised by bilateral atresia of the external auditory canal, inherited in an autosomal dominant manner.

Surgery
Usually, malformations are treated with surgery, although artificial prostheses are also sometimes used.
Preauricular fistulas are generally not treated unless chronically inflamed.
Cosmetic defects without functional impairment are generally repaired after ages 6–7.
If malformations are accompanied by hearing loss amenable to correction, then the early use of hearing aids may prevent complete hearing loss.

Additional images

References

External links 

Auditory system
Ear